The Secret Convention on the Transfer of the Portuguese monarchy to Brazil was an international treaty between Portugal and Britain on October 22, 1807, also called "secret Convention on the transfer to Brazil of the seat of the Portuguese monarchy and temporary occupation of Madeira Island by British troops. " It was signed in London, taking place in the context of the Napoleonic wars. More specifically, it was agreed upon just a few days before the first invasion of Portugal in the Peninsular War, when Napoleonic troops were already approaching the Portuguese borders through Spanish territory. Later, Portuguese aspirations became reality with the support of the British Royal Navy during the transfer of the Portuguese court to Brazil, and Portugal complied with British requirements by opening the Brazilian ports to their goods.

References

1807 in Portugal
Colonial Brazil
Portugal–United Kingdom relations
Treaties of Portugal
Treaties of the United Kingdom
Peninsular War